Alan Hawley may refer to:

 Alan Hawley (footballer) (born 1946), English former footballer
 Alan Hawley (British Army officer), British doctor and academic
 Alan R. Hawley (1869–1938), early aviator in the United States